Since the 1970s, China's People's Liberation Army Navy (PLAN) has had ambitions to develop and operate aircraft carriers, and since 1985 has acquired four retired aircraft carriers for study; namely, the British-built Australian  and the ex-Soviet carriers ,  and . The Varyag later underwent an extensive refit to be converted into the Liaoning, China's first operational aircraft carrier, which also served as a basis for China's subsequent design iterations.

Wang Yunfei, a retired PLA Navy officer and other naval experts projected that China may possess five or six aircraft carriers by the 2030s.

History

Early ambitions 
Since the 1970s, the PLAN has expressed interest in operating an aircraft carrier as part of its blue water aspirations.

To prepare the commanders needed for the future aircraft carriers, the Central Military Commission approved the program of training jet fighter pilots to be future captains in May 1987, and the Guangzhou Naval Academy was selected as the site.

Acquisition of HMAS Melbourne 
China acquired the Royal Australian Navy's decommissioned aircraft carrier  in February 1985, when it was sold to the China United Shipbuilding Company to be towed to China and broken up for scrap. Prior to the ship's departure for China, the RAN stripped Melbourne of all electronic equipment and weapons, and welded her rudders into a fixed position so that she could not be reactivated. However, her steam catapult, arresting equipment and mirror landing system were not removed. At this time, few western experts expected that the Chinese government would attempt to develop aircraft carriers in the future. Melbourne finally arrived in China on 13 June.

The ship was not scrapped immediately; instead she was studied by Chinese naval architects and engineers. It is unclear whether the People's Liberation Army Navy (PLAN) orchestrated the acquisition of Melbourne or simply took advantage of the situation; Rear Admiral Zhang Zhaozhong, a staff member at the National Defence College, has stated that the Navy was unaware of the purchase until Melbourne first arrived at Guangzhou. Melbourne was the largest warship any of the Chinese experts had seen, and they were surprised by the amount of equipment which was still in place. The PLAN subsequently arranged for the ship's flight deck and all the equipment associated with flying operations to be removed so that they could be studied in depth. Reports have circulated that either a replica of the flight deck, or the deck itself, was used for clandestine training of People's Liberation Army Navy pilots in carrier flight operations.

Both the take-off and landing were conducted on the same day, and the test pilot was PLANAF pilot Li Guoqiang. The experience gained would be later applied to the development of the Shenyang J-15.

It has also been claimed that the Royal Australian Navy received and "politely rejected" a request from the PLAN for blueprints of the ship's steam catapult. The carrier was not dismantled for many years; according to some rumours she was not completely broken up until 2002.

Other acquisition attempts 
China also negotiated with Spain in an effort purchase the blueprints for proposed conventional take off/landing ships from Empresa Nacional Bazán, specifically 23,000-ton SAC-200 and 25,000-ton SAC-220 designs. Negotiations started between 1995 and 1996 but did not result in any purchase. However, the Spanish firm was paid several million US dollars in consulting fees, indicating the probable transfer of some design concepts.

Minsk, along with its sister ship , were initially sold to South Korea in 1995 to be scrapped, but due to objections from environmentalists, Minsk was resold to China in 1998 to be broken up there instead. Kiev, likewise, was sold to China in 2000 by Russia with a contractual requirement for it to be scrapped. However, neither ship was dismantled and both were instead converted into tourist attractions, with Minsk turned into a theme park and Kiev a luxury hotel.

In 1997, China attempted to purchase the retired French aircraft carrier , but negotiations between China and France failed.

Liaoning (Type 001)

The 67,500 ton ex-Soviet aircraft carrier Varyag, which was only 68% completed and floating in Ukraine, was purchased through a private Macau tourist venture in 1998. Following her troublesome tow to Dalian shipyard, the carrier underwent a long refit. Varyag had been stripped of any military equipment as well as her propulsion systems prior to being put up for sale. In 2007 there were news reports that she was being fitted-out to enter service.

In 2011, People's Liberation Army Chief of the General Staff Chen Bingde confirmed that China was constructing at least one aircraft carrier. On 10 August 2011, it was announced that the refurbishment of Varyag was complete, and that it was undergoing sea trials.

On 14 December 2011, DigitalGlobe, an American Satellite imaging company, announced that while scouring through pictures taken 8 December, it had discovered the retrofitted Varyag undergoing trials, DigitalGlobe further stated that their images captured the ship in the Yellow Sea where it operated for 5 days.

In September 2012, it was announced that this carrier would be named Liaoning, after Liaoning Province of China. In September 2012, China's first aircraft carrier, Liaoning, was commissioned. On 23 September 2012, Liaoning was handed over to the People's Liberation Army Navy, but was not yet in active service.

In November 2012, the first landing was successfully conducted on Liaoning with Shenyang J-15.

Four years later, in November 2016, it was reported that Liaoning was combat ready. China has confirmed that it is constructing a second carrier that will be built entirely with indigenous Chinese designs. Similar to Liaoning, China's second carrier will also use a ski jump for takeoff.

Current status
In mid-2007, Chinese domestic sources revealed that China had purchased a total of four sets of aircraft carrier landing systems from Russia and this was confirmed by Russian manufacturers. However, experts disagreed on the usage of these systems: while some have claimed that it is a clear evidence of the construction of an aircraft carrier, others claim these systems are used to train pilots for a future ship. Reports initially claimed that up to two carriers based on the Varyag would be started by 2015.

According to the Nippon News Network (NNN), research and development on the planned carriers is being carried out at a military research facility in Wuhan.  NNN states that the actual carriers will be constructed at Jiangnan Shipyard in Shanghai.  Kanwa Intelligence Review reports that the second carrier to be constructed will likely be assigned to Qingdao.

According to a February 2011 report in The Daily Telegraph, the Chinese military has constructed a concrete aircraft carrier flight deck to use for training carrier pilots and carrier operations personnel.  The deck was constructed on top of a government building near Wuhan (Wuhan Technical College of Communication campus next to Huangjiahu). On 7 June 2011, People's Liberation Army Chief of the General Staff Chen Bingde confirmed that China was constructing its own aircraft carrier. He stated he would provide no further details until it was complete.

On 30 July 2011, a senior researcher of the Academy of Military Sciences said China needed at least three aircraft carriers. "If we consider our neighbours, India will have three aircraft carriers by 2014 and Japan will have three carriers by 2014, so I think the number (for China) should not be less than three so we can defend our rights and our maritime interests effectively." General Luo Yuan. In July 2011, a Chinese official announced that two aircraft carriers were being built at the Jiangnan Shipyard in Shanghai. On 21 May 2012, Taiwan's intelligence chief Tsai Teh-sheng told the Legislative Yuan that the PLA Navy plans to build two carriers, scheduled to start construction in 2013 and 2015 and launch in 2020 and 2022 respectively. The price of the two vessels is estimated to be worth US$9 Billion dollars. On 24 April 2013, Chinese Rear Admiral Song Xue confirmed that China will build more carriers and these will be larger and will carry more fighter-planes than Liaoning.

Shandong (Type 002) 

The Type 002, or Shandong, is China's first domestically produced aircraft carrier. Construction began in November 2013 and the ship was launched on 26 April 2017. After being fitted out, China's first homemade aircraft carrier underwent nine sea trials over the course of 18 months, starting from May 2018. The ship was formally commissioned into service on 19 December 2019 as the Shandong, with pennant number "17".

The 002 is a conventionally powered ski jump carrier with a displacement of around 70,000 tonnes. The ship is derived from the Liaoning. It uses conventional steam turbines with diesel generators as propulsion.  The Shandong is a significant improvement over the Soviet-built Liaoning. For example, the Shandong carrier's ski-jump has an angle of 12.0°, an angle ideal for launching the Shenyang J-15 fighter, instead of the 14.0° on the Liaoning.  Together with the enlarged hangar, the island (which has been made smaller by 10%), and extended on sponsons in the aft-starboard quarter, space has been freed up allowing for up to eight more aircraft and helicopters to be carried.  The island includes a second glazed deck which permits the bridge and flight control areas to be separate, creating greater operational efficiency.  It also features a faceted upper area of four active electronically scanned arrays (AESAs) for the S-band Type 346 radar.

Fujian (Type 003) 

The third aircraft carrier, known as Fujian, is an entirely different design than Liaoning and Shandong. It is the largest of China's current fleet. The Type 003 will have a displacement of around 85,000 to 100,000 tonnes and be slightly smaller in size than the US Navy's Ford Class ships.

In 2015, media reports stated that both an electromagnetic catapult and a steam-powered catapult were constructed at the Huangdicun naval base for testing; this is thought to indicate that the Type 003 class as well as future PLAN carriers could possibly be CATOBAR carriers.

The construction of the first Type 003 class aircraft carrier started in February 2017. Satellite observation at the Jiangnan Shipyard in Shanghai only shows one carrier of this type under construction.

It was reported in early 2021 that the first ship would be launched in the same year, with construction already started on a second ship in this class. On 10 November 2021, Bloomberg reported that "China is three to six months away from launching its third aircraft carrier", citing a report by the Center for Strategic and International Studies. On June 17, 2022, the Type 003, now named Fujian was officially completed and launched.

Type 004 

The Type 004 is planned to be larger than the Type 003, and also feature nuclear propulsion, which could power weapons like lasers and railguns. It is claimed that construction started in December 2017 at Jiangnan Shipyard.

Development of carrier-based aircraft 
China initially intended to acquire Russian Sukhoi Su-33 carrier-based aircraft to be operated from its aircraft carriers.  However, China later developed the Shenyang J-15 as a derivative of the Su-33, featuring Chinese technology and avionics from the J-11B program.  On 25 November 2012, it was announced that at least two Shenyang J-15s had successfully landed on Liaoning.  The pilot credited with having achieved the first landing was Dai Mingmeng. According to Chinese media reports, the J-15 cannot take off from Liaoning with a full fuel and munition load, being unable to get off the carrier's ski jump-ramp if the payload exceeds . In a follow up review by Rick Joe of the Diplomat in 2021, he argued that the source of this Chinese media was unreliable and proved that the J-15 was able to take off with MTOW when the speed of the carrier was taken into calculation.

The Shenyang FC-31 is an in-development medium-sized fifth-generation stealth fighter that may in future be adopted for carrier use.  The South China Morning Post reported on 6 July 2018 that China is developing an upgraded variant of the FC-31 as an alternate carrier operational jet.

The Xi'an KJ-600 is an in-development high-straight wing AEW&C aircraft suspected to be fitted with an AESA-type radome system, and current non-flying mock-up model has a striking external resemblance to the aftward-folding Northrop Grumman E-2 Hawkeye, a carrier-based AEW&C aircraft serving the United States Navy. The design is likely to be a case of form following function, as the cancelled Soviet Yak-44 shared the same layout. Rick Joe, who writes extensively on Chinese aviation and naval developments for The Diplomat', commented that "fixed-wing carrier-borne AEW&C are a vital and essential part to any navy that seeks to field a robust and capable carrier airwing, and their ability to enhance a carrier group's offensive and defensive capabilities and overall situational awareness and network-centric warfare is unmatched by any other platform type that will exist in the near future." Analysts H. I. Sutton believed the KJ-600 will be a massive boost to the Chinese Navy, and "once it enters service on the carriers, it will greatly enhance the aerial and maritime situational awareness, and the offensive and defensive capabilities of the carrier group", and that "Chinese aerospace and military industry has certainly shown its ability to develop quite modern and capable AEW&C systems for other air, naval and ground applications".

List of carriers

See also

List of aircraft carriers in service
DF-21D – Chinese anti-ship ballistic missile

References

External links 
 China / Aircraft Carrier Project, GlobalSecurity.org
 Rick Joe, A Mid-2019 Guide to Chinese Aircraft Carriers: What is the future trajectory of the Chinese People's Liberation Army Navy carrier program?, "The Diplomat," 18 June 2019. Varying use of "“001A” and “002” designations

 
Proposed aircraft carriers
Projects established in 2015
2015 in China